Shepard J. Crumpacker Jr. (February 13, 1917 – October 14, 1986) was an American lawyer, jurist, World War II veteran, and politician who served three terms as a U.S. representative from Indiana from 1951 to 1957. He was a cousin of Edgar Dean Crumpacker and Maurice Edgar Crumpacker.

Early life and career 
Crumpacker was born in South Bend, Indiana, where he attended the public schools. Crumpacker graduated from Northwestern University in 1938, and from the University of Michigan Law School in 1941. He was admitted to the bar the same year and commenced the practice of law in South Bend.

Crumpacker owned and operated a farm and served as delegate to Indiana State Republican conventions from 1958 through 1970.

World War II 
Crumpacker entered the United States Army Air Corps as a private on September 26, 1941, during World War II, and advanced through the ranks to flight chief in a fighter squadron. Crumpacker was commissioned as a lieutenant in 1943 and assigned to heavy-bomber maintenance. Crumpacker was Relieved from active duty as a first lieutenant on March 1, 1946, and thereafter was a major in the United States Air Force Reserve.

Congress 
Crumpacker was elected as a Republican to the Eighty-second, Eighty-third, and Eighty-fourth Congresses (January 3, 1951 – January 3, 1957). He did not seek renomination in 1956.

Later career and death 
Crumpacker practiced law until 1977, when he was appointed judge of the St. Joseph Superior Court and served until 1985. He was a resident of South Bend, Indiana, until his death there on October 14, 1986. He is interred in Riverview Cemetery.

References

1917 births
1986 deaths
Northwestern University alumni
University of Michigan Law School alumni
Politicians from South Bend, Indiana
United States Army Air Forces officers
United States Air Force officers
20th-century American politicians
United States Army Air Forces personnel of World War II
United States Air Force reservists
Republican Party members of the United States House of Representatives from Indiana